Welayah or Walaya (meaning "guardianship" or “governance”) is a general concept of the Islamic faith and a key word in Shia Islam that refers, among other things, to the nature and function of the Imamate.

Welayah is a word which a power gives authority/guardianship to a person, community, or country that is under the direction and rule on behalf of another. "Wali" is someone who has "Walayah" (authority or guardianship) over somebody else. For example, in fiqh, a father is wali of his children. The term wali holds a special importance in Islamic spiritual life and it is used with various meanings, which relate to its different functions, which include: “next of kin, ally, friend, helper, guardian, patron, and saint”. In Islam, the phrase  walīyu l-Lāh can be used to denote one vested with the "authority of God":

"In the name of God the Merciful, the Compassionate: Only God is your wali and his messenger and those who believe, establish worship, and pay the poor due while bowing down (in prayer)."

Terminology
Two nouns are derived from the root W-L-Y : walayah and wilayah, which means to be near to something, to be a friend of someone or to have power.  The term welayah also has similarity with AWLIA.  The term Wali derives from Quran. It occurs also in a number of hadith qudsi, such as “whoever harms a friend (walī) of Mine, I declare war against him and others".
Welayah means literally "nearness" or " closeness" in which there is judgmental nearness on slavery. Also it means that being dependent of slave to Truth or God in annihilating. The welayah in the Sharia is the implementation of saying to others either will or not will.
Arab lexicographers and semanticists distinguish between the words "wilayah" and "walayah." According to that, walayah sometimes represent the sense of assistance, alliance or nusrah, while wilayah invariably denotes the idea of power, authority or sultan.

The concept of Walayah
There are several kinds of Walayah: Wila of love or nearness which implies that the household of the prophet are his near relatives and the believers should love them. Awliya Allah means the friends of Allah or the beloved of Allah. Walaya is  a key word in Shi‘ism that refers among other things to the nature and function of the Imamate.

According to Hamid Algar, the first definition of wali was provided by Abu’l-Qāsem Qošayrī (d. 467/1074-75), who said that wali has two kind of meanings: passive and active. Wali as passive designates one whose affairs are completely guided by God the exalted. Wali as active designates one who takes it on himself to worship God and obey him. On the other hand, some mystics, such as Najm-al-dīn Dāya, define welayah according to the concept of love and friendship. Also we can find out the other meaning for wali as "closeness" which means "one who is close." A wali is an elected man among believers for the sake of his spiritual proximity to God Almighty. Also, walayah has a close relation to imamate; in other words there is inseparable linkage between imamiyyah (belief in the imamate) and walayah, which included five pillars such as love and devotion to the people of the household of the Prophet or Imams, following them in religion, obedience to their commands and abstention from what they prohibited, imitation of their actions and conduct, and recognition of their rights and belief in their imamate.  Wila of leadership or authority over religious matters, such a position needs Ismah and the speech and deed of the leader is an example for others as is regarded in verses 33:21, 3:31. and whatever he says is a divine proof.Imams or Awliya all make up the long chain of the Friends of God who carry and transmit the divine Covenant or welayah. According to  an esoteric interpretation, during the World of the Pact ('âlam* al-mîthâq) — a world with  the "pure beings" in the form of particles or shadows — we can see four oaths, including oaths of love and fidelity (walâya) toward Muhammad and his prophetic mission toward the Imams and their sacred Cause, and also toward the Mahdi as universal savior at the end of the world. Mohammad Ali Amir-Moezzi believes that it is the very term of welayah that denotes the ontological-theological status of the Imam. It is said that walâya has a quite simple translation along with two independent and complementary meanings. First it applies to the Imams of different prophets and also refers to  their ontological status or their sacred initiatory mission. The second meaning is the "chief," the master of believers par excellence. In this interpretation, walî is a synonym of wasî, "the inheritor" or "the heir." According to second meaning, walaya applied to the faithful of the Imams. It also denotes the unfailing love, faith, and submission that the initiated owe to their holy initiating guide. The Shia believe that every great prophet is accompanied by one or more Imams in his mission.

Walayah of socio-political leadership
Spiritual Walayah which concerns changing the potentials to the action and making the people to get to the divine nearness, therefore there is a proof in every age. The Wali has a kind of creative power over the world and the men. Corbin states that Walayah is the foundation of the prophecy and the mission of the messenger. And it concerns to the esoteric dimension of the prophetic reality. Abu al-Hasan Sharif Isfahani, a student of Muhammad Baqir Majlisi, by many hadith argues that "the walayah is the inner, esoteric meaning (batin) of the Qur'anic Revelation.".
Mulla Sadra states that the genealogical descendants of Muhammad and his spiritual heirs are Awliya. Dakake describes Walayah as a spiritual inheritance, esoteric knowledge, that Imams inherit from the prophets. Which expresses the spiritual and political authority of ahl al-Bayt. Tabatabaei regards that Walayah is the esoteric dimension of the Imamah and it is not just guiding the man, but it is conveying the man to the Truth.

Argument

By Quran
By verse 42:23 and hadith of Ghadir, the prophet called the Muslims to love his pure, sinless family. Al-Tabari, Az-Zamakhshari and Fakhru'd-Din ar-Razi state that verse 5:55 is revealed about Ali. The verse implies that Allah and His prophet is the Wali and the holders of the authority of the Muslims and the believers must accept their Wila. This bond of love further causes that the Muslims follow their speeches, deeds, behaviors. In Quran, the term walayah is used in conjunction with nusrah and it is not only used in relation to God but also is used for those who have perfect devotion to God. Some traditions state that the verse 7:172 deals with the primordial pact (mithaq) that God has taken for His Lordship and the Walayah to the prophet and the ahl al-Bayt. In the Quran, the term shows a link between faithfulness to God and devotion to the members of the community. Tabatabaei claims that wherever Quran ascribes the guardianship for the prophet, it means authority and devotion. By the verse 5:55, he claims that as the word Walayah once is used for Allah and His messenger and those who have believed, though they are under His Guardianship and at last he proves that the prophet's obedience is God's obedience.

By hadith
Ar-Razi quotes from az-Zamakhshari that the Prophet said: "Who so ever died in the love of the Household of Muhammad has died a martyr; Whosoever died in the love of the Household of Muhammad has died in forgiveness; Whosoever died in the love of the Household of Muhammad has died a believer and in the perfection of his faith. Whosoever dies in enmity to the family of Muhammad, dies an nbeliever. Whosoever dies in enmity of the family of Muhammad,will not smell the scent of Paradise."
A hadith al-Baqir narrates that "Islam is built upon five: prayer, alms-giving, fasting, pilgrimage, and walayah; and not one of them was proclaimed, the way walayah was proclaimed. Hasan ibn Ali narrates that after professing tawhid and the mission of the prophets, nothing is more important than professing to the Walayah of Imams. Ja'far al-Sadiq told that Imam separates the people of the Heaven from the Hell, without any judgement, because their love for the Imam is their Heaven or Hell respectively. The prophet tells Ali that he heard Allah say to him: "I wrote thy name and his name on My Throne before creating the creatures because of my love of you both. Whoever loves you and takes you as friends numbers among those drawn-nigh to Me. Whoever rejects your walayah and separates himself from you numbers among the impious transgressors against Me."." Al-Baqir states that "...There was never a prophet nor an angel who did not profess the religion of our love."

Theological and philosophical argument

In Shia tradition, walayah is not only one of the pillars of Islam; it is the religion itself. For Shia, Imamah is bound with the Walayah which is believing their Imamate and loving them, following and obeying them in religion and in their deeds. Shia argue that the salvation is in the practice of the Walayah to the ahl al-Bayt. and an intention of love is required for the acceptance of every religious act. Many hadith by Imams narrate that "the first thing about which a man is questioned after his death is his love for ahl al-Bayt. If he has professed this love (walayah) and died professing it, then his deeds are acceptable to Allah. If he has not professed this love, then none of his works will be capable of being accepted by Allah." Muhammad Baqir Majlisi states that all Imamis agree that deeds without love to Imams are empty formality and Allah's approval is conditioned to Imam. The ʾUlu al-ʿAzm got this title by accepting the Walayah of the prophet and the Imams and Mahdi. The prophet established the religion and Imams are to preserve the religion and to lead the people by the divine guidance (walayah) which they inherited through the prophet. A hadith narrates, "He who knows himself knows his Lord", but without theophanic form (mazhar) and the Face of Allah, through whom Allah displays Himself, even to speak of Allah is impossible. Without the knowledge of Allah and Divine revelation, man will be trapped in ta'til (agnosticism) and tashbih (anthropomorphism).

According to Shia the end of the prophecy was the beginning of Walayah which is its esoteric dimension and complementary. Walayah embraces both the idea  of knowledge (Ma'rifah) and the idea of love (Mahabbah). While prophecy is the exoteric (zahir) dimension of religion, Walayah is its esoteric (batin) dimension; they are simultaneous. Walayah is the esoteric dimension of Shariah which renews the man and the religion spiritually in all the times and purifies the society without any need to a new religion. Wali carries the Muhammadan Light which has existed in all the prophets. By this Muhammadan Light, Imam leads over the society, propagates the religion and guides the spiritual life of the men. Shi'ites believe that the cycle of the prophecy is succeeded by the cycle of Imamah which of its essentials is Walayah e.g. "the esoteric aspect of prophecy". They as the Friends of Allah (awliya' Allah) get the divine secrets through the divine inspiration and on this basis God make them the human Guides. The prophet reveals the shariah (zahir) and Imam brings the haqiqah (batin) of the religion, so the batin is not separate from the zahir.
Walayah is the foundation of the prophecy (nubuwah) and the messengership (risalah), so, closer to the inner realities, more sufficient and nearer to God. As Wali is concerned with guiding the spiritual life of the community, his presence in  the community is not effective.
As all the possible beings are dependent to self-existent, this dependence results on the authority of the self-existent; so Walayah is just his right and he can designate this authority to whom he chooses.

History of the concept of Walayah

The concept of Walayah is present at the early Shia history which indicates the legitimacy of Alids and an allegiance to ahl al-Bayt. The term derives from a statement of the Prophet at Ghadir Khumm, in which he reportedly designated Ali as the Mawla or Wali of the believers. During the Imamate of al-Baqir and al-Sadiq, the concept of Walayah, as a prerequisite for membership in the Shia community, becomes a fundamental concept in the Shia discourse and is reinterpreted. It implies a state of full devotion to ahl al-Bayt and a recognition of their exclusive right to legitimate leadership of the community. Shia argues that the perfection of the religion depends on the practice of Walayah. Walayah as one of the fundamentals of Islam, deriven from Ghadir Khum traditions by al-Baqir, originates at his time. And it is presented as the essence of the religion in this period. At the Time of al-Sadiq, the focus on the term Walayah changed to Imamah. In this age, the word iman and Walayah is tied. Later on Walayah is replaced by iman. By the First Civil War, It is used side by side with the word enmity (adawah) = (Tabarra) reflecting the loyalty to the Shia community (Tawalla).

For Sufism, There is a problem about definition of walī and his attributes when wali compared to prophet. It seems that the notion of wali was superior to nabi in third/ninth. Someones such as  Abū Bakr Ḵarrāz(d. 286/899) and following him, Ḥakīm Termeḏī (d. between 295/907 and 310/922) refuted this superiority. They believed that the prophethood has superiority over wali. However they maintained that there are many different categories for welayah. On this occasion, Ḥakīm Termeḏī divided wali into two categories: welāya ʿāmma, which embraces all believers, and welāya ḵāṣṣa, which pertains exclusively to the spiritual elect.
Ibn Arabi also refers to a relation between nabi and wali. He believed that although the prophet is indeed superior to wali, nabi is himself a wali besides being prophet. Ibn Arabi also mentioned that the wali-aspect of nabi's being is superior to the nabi-dimension. Syed Ahmad Khan agreed with Ibn Arabi's view and explained it.

Ismaili and Druze pillar

Walayah or Walayat is a pillar of Shia Islam specifically in Ismaili and Druze denoting:
"love and devotion for God, the Prophets, the Imam and the dai.".
One should have Walayat (guardianship of the faith) on the wali. If someone has been made Wali of yours than have full walayat (guardianship of faith) of him. Dawoodi Bohras believe Walayah to be the most important of the seven pillars of Islam. It is the acceptance of guardianship of Allah, through His Da'i, Imam, Wasi (Wali), Ali and prophet Muhammad. To accept that Ali is Wali of Allah is doing "Walayat" of Ali. For Shia "Walayat" of Ali (and his further representatives) is a must.

There is a famous incident mentioned amongst the writings of Dawoodi Bohra which confirms how Ismaili interpret the principle of walayah. An order was issued by the 19th Da'i al-Mutlaq, Syedna Idris Imad al-Din, to his Wali al-Hind, Moulai Adam, to follow a person named Sakka. Moulai Adam, along with his followers, willingly performed prayer behind Sakka, who was a simple water carrier by trade. This showed that Adam had full walayah for his Da'i and had willingly accepted his guardianship and followed his order.

Qadi al-Nu'man, a famous Muslim jurist of the Fatimid period, identifies walaya, the concept that God's authority must always have a representative in creation, as the most important pillar of Islam, that “imbues all other pillars with meaning and efficacy”. In his work The Foundation of Symbolic Interpretation (Asas al-Tawil) he talks about the history of walaya throughout the lives of the prophets and the succession of imams from the time of Adam to Muhammad.Wali in the most literal form of the word means "a person, community, or country that is under the direction and rule of another." It is an Arabic word derived from the root W-L-Y , which carries the basic meanings of “friendship, assistance”, and “authority or power”. from The word holds a special importance in Islamic spiritual life and it is used with various meanings, which relate to its different functions, which include: “next of kin, ally, friend, helper, guardian, patron, and saint”. The eternal prophetic reality has two aspects: exoteric and esoteric.
In its connotation of sainthood, the word describes an innate sense of selflessness and separation from one's own wants in favor of awareness of being “under the dominion of the all-living, self-subsistent one and of the need to acquire nearness to the necessarily existent being – which is God.”.
Individuals that have attained this level are believed to be both favored and live in a state of nearness with God. The first step in sainthood is indicated in the Qur'an verse (2:257):
God is He Who loves, guards and directs those who believe; He has led them out of all kinds of darkness into the light, and keeps them firm therein.
and also in (10:62):
Know well that the confidants (saintly servants) of God-there will be no reason for them to fear (both in this world and the next, for they shall always find My help and support with them), nor shall they grieve.
One who has been favored with sainthood is called a wali or Waliullah, meaning a saint. Waliullah may also be translated as a word used to describe a certain group of people selected by God from among millions of others to be “His friends” because of their closeness to God.  And thus, a saint, or a friend to God, is thought to have favor in the eyes of the Lord.
For an individual to achieve walaya, or sainthood, a person must first become, and remain, a pristine example of a truly religious person, an example for all other Muslims to look up to. Upon these individuals, the peace and blessing of God have been placed. In the Qur'an, walaya is expressed in the Sura al-Kahf's fable of the rich but immoral owner of two gardens and his poor but pious companion. The rich man ends up a loser despite his prosperity and power, for ultimately, the walayah belongs to God, the Truth (18:44).

See also

Islamic leadership
Imamah (Shi'a doctrine)
Imamah (Twelver Shi`i Doctrine)
Imamah (Ismaili doctrine)
Imamah (Nizari Ismaili doctrine)
Tayyibi

Notes

Footnotes

References

Further reading
 Lawson, Todd. Friendship, Illumination and the Water of Life''. Journal of the Muhyiddin Ibn Arabi Society, Vol. 59, 2016.

Shia theology
Islamic terminology
Ismailism
Druze theology
Sufism
Arabic words and phrases